The canton of Chartreuse-Guiers is an administrative division of the Isère department, eastern France. It was created at the French canton reorganisation which came into effect in March 2015. Its seat is in Saint-Laurent-du-Pont.

It consists of the following communes:
 
Les Abrets-en-Dauphiné
Aoste
Charancieu
Chimilin
Entre-deux-Guiers
Granieu
Merlas
Miribel-les-Échelles
Le Pont-de-Beauvoisin
Pressins
Romagnieu
Saint-Albin-de-Vaulserre
Saint-Bueil
Saint-Christophe-sur-Guiers
Saint-Geoire-en-Valdaine
Saint-Jean-d'Avelanne
Saint-Joseph-de-Rivière
Saint-Laurent-du-Pont
Saint-Martin-de-Vaulserre
Saint-Pierre-de-Chartreuse
Saint-Pierre-d'Entremont
Velanne
Voissant

References

Cantons of Isère